Flirtisha Harris (born December 21, 1972) is an American sprinter. She won first place in the 200 m and the 4 × 100 m relay race at the 1993 Summer Universiade. At the 1995 IAAF World Indoor Championships, she was a bronze medalist in the 4 × 400 m relay, along with her teammates Nelrae Pasha, Tanya Dooley, and Kim Graham. In the 1995 Pan American Games, Harris came in third in the 400 m, first in the 4x100 relay, and second in the 4 × 400 m relay. Harris attended Seton Hall University where she was named 1992 female athlete of the year, and she won the NCAA championships indoor and outdoor 400 m races in 1994.

Competition record

References 

 

American female sprinters
World Athletics Indoor Championships medalists
Universiade gold medalists for the United States
Universiade gold medalists in athletics (track and field)
Medalists at the 1993 Summer Universiade
1972 births
Living people
Seton Hall Pirates women's track and field athletes
Pan American Games medalists in athletics (track and field)
Medalists at the 1995 Pan American Games
Athletes (track and field) at the 1995 Pan American Games
Pan American Games gold medalists for the United States
Pan American Games silver medalists for the United States
Pan American Games bronze medalists for the United States